Pennington Field is a multi-purpose stadium located in Bedford, Texas. The 12,500-capacity facility is primarily used for local high school football and soccer teams of Trinity High School and L.D. Bell High School. It is owned and operated by the Hurst-Euless-Bedford Independent School District.  

In addition to high school sports, Pennington Field was previously used by the DFW Tornados of the Premier Development League from 2004-2010, the American Eightman Football League (AEFL), and the Red River Bowl for NJCAA.

Pennington Field does not have a track around the field, partly because the city of Bedford has an ordinance requiring all tracks to be open to the public.  The result is that the seats are closer to the sidelines, creating a more intimate spectator experience.

History
The name "Pennington Field" was first given to an existing American football field near what was then L. D. Bell High School (now the site of Central Junior High).  The field was named for Fred Pennington, the L.D. Bell High School football coach, after his accidental death in 1962.

The stadium opened in 1987 as a state-of-the-art venue that would host not only American football games, but soccer matches and special events as well.  Pennington Field is still well known in the Dallas-Fort Worth Metroplex as one of the most advanced and high-quality high school sports stadiums in the area. In June 2010, the stadium's playing surface was replaced with a new Hellas Matrix turf. The artificial turf field is specially engineered to allow for proper drainage.

References

External links
 Official Site (hebisd.edu)

Sports venues in Texas
American football venues in the Dallas–Fort Worth metroplex
High school football venues in Texas
Soccer venues in Texas
Hurst-Euless-Bedford Independent School District
Multi-purpose stadiums in the United States
DFW Tornados
1987 establishments in Texas
Sports venues completed in 1987